Travnoye is a rural locality (a selo) in Mamontovsky District, Altai Krai, Russia. The population was 403 as of 2013. There are 4 streets.

Geography 
Travnoye is located on the Priobskoye Plato, 26 km southeast of Mamontovo (the district's administrative centre) by road. Urlapovo is the nearest rural locality.

References 

Rural localities in Mamontovsky District